White House Task Force may refer to:
 Presidential task force
 White House Coronavirus Task Force
 White House Task Force to Protect Students from Sexual Assault
 White House Task Force on Women's Rights and Responsibilities
 White House Economic Task Force (see Great American Economic Revival Industry Groups)